Ex parte McCardle, 74 U.S. (7 Wall.) 506 (1869), is a United States Supreme Court decision that examines the extent of the jurisdiction of the Supreme Court to review decisions of lower courts under federal statutory law.

Case history
During the Civil War Reconstruction, newspaper publisher William McCardle printed some "incendiary" articles, advocating opposition to the Reconstruction laws enacted by Congress. He was jailed by a military commander under the Military Reconstruction Act of 1867. McCardle invoked habeas corpus in the Circuit Court of the Southern District of Mississippi. The judge sent him back into custody, finding the military actions legal under Congress' law. He appealed to the Supreme Court under the Habeas Corpus Act of 1867, which granted appellate jurisdiction to review denial of habeas corpus petitions.  After the case was argued but before an opinion was delivered, Congress suspended the Supreme Court's jurisdiction over the case, exercising the powers granted under Article III, section 2 of the Constitution.

Issues
Two issues were raised by this case: Whether the Supreme Court had jurisdiction to hear the case, and if so, whether McCardle's imprisonment violated his Fifth Amendment Due Process rights.

Holdings

Chief Justice Chase, writing for a unanimous court, validated congressional withdrawal of the Court's jurisdiction. The basis for this repeal was the exceptions clause of Article III, section 2. But Chase pointedly reminded his readers that the 1868 statute repealing jurisdiction "does not affect the jurisdiction which was previously exercised." Since the Court held it lacked jurisdiction to hear the case, the second question was not answered. Since Congress withdrew jurisdiction to hear the case, McCardle had no legal recourse to challenge his imprisonment in federal court.

Rationale
Durousseau v. United States, 10  U.S. 307 (1810)  held that Congress's affirmative description of certain judicial powers implied a negation of all other powers. Creating such legislation was legitimate under the authority granted them by the United States Constitution. By repealing the act that granted the Supreme Court authority to hear the case,  Congress made a clear statement that they were using this Constitutional authority to remove the Supreme Court's jurisdiction. The court had no choice but to dismiss the case.

See also
List of United States Supreme Court cases, volume 74
List of United States Supreme Court cases

Notes

External links

 
 Ex parte McCardle Case Brief at Lawnix.com

United States Supreme Court cases of the Chase Court
1869 in United States case law
Exceptions Clause case law
Reconstruction Era
United States Constitution Article Three case law
United States Fifth Amendment case law
Criminal cases in the Chase Court
United States Supreme Court cases